"Old Love / New Love" is a song by American singer-songwriter Twin Shadow featuring D'Angelo Lacy. It was written for the 2013 video game Grand Theft Auto V, broadcast on the fictional radio station Radio Mirror Park, which Shadow hosted. To promote the video game, the song was released as a single on September 13, 2013, and Rockstar Games included it on their soundtrack album The Music of Grand Theft Auto V, on the Vol. 1: Original Music side. Musically, "Old Love / New Love" is a dance and house song with R&B and  influences, whose lyrics describe the protagonist being confused by a phone call he received from an ex-girlfriend whom he still loves despite his sorrow.

The song was included in the final track list of Shadow's third studio album Eclipse, which Warner Bros. published in 2015. When "Old Love / New Love" was first released, it was praised by music critics for its composition, which set it apart from previous Shadow tracks, and reviewers named it a dance-floor-friendly song. The singer promoted the song in several live performances that same year, and it was remixed by American DJ Armand Van Helden.

Background

Rockstar Games published the action-adventure game videogame Grand Theft Auto V (GTA V) on September 17, 2013. Its soundtrack contained 214 songs when it was first released, including the track "Old Love / New Love", which was written specifically for the video game by George "Twin Shadow" Lewis Jr., D'Angelo Lacy and Dennis Herring. In an interview for Ouch, My Ego! Shadow explained he was involved in the project because he "kind of become friends with" some developers and they wanted to work with him "for a long time". Shadow also hosted the in-game radio station known as Radio Mirror Park. He responded positively when they contacted him and asked if he "wanted to host the radio show and do songs for the soundtrack." 

The lyrics, according to Shadow, are "a little bit about someone trying to get back into your life and have you repeat what has happened but then again, you know, to the top [he tries and talks] about how sometimes doing everything over again, even though it's all messed up, it's also important". A music critic from Tiny Mix Tapes said "Old Love / New Love" depicts "a relationship of extremes". According to Ascher Kulich of The Tufts Daily, Shadow still has feelings for his ex-lover despite her "calling and hurting him". The refrain of "Old Love / New Love" includes the line "Drill me to the floor, this hurts even more than I expected it to do", which Christopher Monk from musicOMH considered it a "desperate death throe", and Andrew Unterberger defined the phone call from the ex-girlfriend to influence "evocative and discomfiting lyrics".

Composition

Herring and Shadow record produced "Old Love / New Love"; the latter also played bass guitar, drums, guitar, and keyboards. Ted Jensen and Joe LaPorta handled the track's mastering, while Wynne Bennett added additional keyboards, Ryan Gilligan audio mixing, and Lacy contributed featured vocals. Tiny Mix Tapes compared the vocals to those of Michael McDonald, and wrote the song features a disco-influenced guitar, a "Geiger counter" drum program, and a simple house beat. The track has a tempo of 116 beats per minute, and it incorporates piano house elements, guitars, drum beats, combined with a synthesizer. Kulich said the refrain is sung with a "catchy,  [sound] in the background"; Jamie Milton defined it for DIY as a "gigantic trance chorus", and Dan Reilly, from Spin, said that during that verse the song becomes "an electrifying jam".

Release and promotion
To promote GTA V, "Old Love / New Love" was released as a single, on September 13, 2013. The single cover features the black-and-white face of Shadow sticking his tongue out; music critics Alex Young and Josiah Hughes complimented it. On September 24, Rockstar Games released the soundtrack album The Music of Grand Theft Auto V, and the song was featured on the Vol. 1: Original Music album. In March 2015, Warner Bros. released Shadow's third album titled Eclipse, which included "Old Love / New Love". In that year Shadow gave several performances of the song, including the Troubadour, in Los Angeles, the Music Hall of Williamsburg, in New York City, the South Side Music Hall, in Dallas, at Fordham University's WFUV radio station, after a cross-country train trek, and the Landmark Music Festival. In 2015, when asked about if he would film more music videos, Shadow commented about filming one for "Old Love / New Love", but it would be difficult because of his touring schedule. The song was remixed by American DJ Armand Van Helden that same year.

Critical reception

After its 2013 release Dan Reilly called "Old Love / New Love" "soulful"; Ian Cohen wrote for Pitchfork that the song's "gleaming piano" flirts with Shadow's sincere "heatseaking lyricism". In a Death and Taxes review, Alex Moore praised its introduction as Shadow "makes you wade through about 30 seconds of wind-up" and the singer chants the hook "about 50 seconds [later]". According to him, when the hook happens it is "good", and lauded the conclusion, and that unlike Lorde's "Team", which was released on the same day, "Old Love / New Love" "is your new fucking jam". Jamie Milton penned for DIY it fits to the "mass rampages and elaborate bank robberies" featured in GTA V, and he compared it to David Guetta's music. Alex Young mentioned in Consequence of Sound the song was more suitable for the dance clubs than " killing spree"; During his The Music of Grand Theft Auto V soundtrack review, Gerrit Feenstra called "Old Love / New Love", for KEXP-FM, as "one of the finest tracks" from it, a feeling Pat Levy shared in a Consequence of Sound review, adding it is Shadow's best efforts ever, and marked it as an "essential track". Feenstra, in a separate review for the same radio station, claimed its "over-dramatic [tone]" matches without the context of the soundtrack. The song was ranked at number 71 on Rolling Stones 100 Best Songs of 2013, with a commentary comparing it to "Get Lucky" (2013) by Daft Punk and Pharrell Williams.

After the release of Eclipse, Embling for Tiny Mix Tapes praised the song and Shadow. In his analysis for Slant Magazine Jesse Cataldo examined it as cheerful and "less focused on grandiloquence" so it achieves to "[build] up an uncanny, off-kilter momentum"; Ian Gormely considered for Exclaim! that Shadow created a "sublime catharsis"; AllMusic's Heather Phares lauded its contemporary sound; Philip Cosores from Paste commented it is Shadow's funniest song; Jayson Greene from Pitchfork labeled it as "sexy"; Sand Avidar-Walzer described it for Glide as "a straight-up summer house jam"; Ryan Leas wrote for Stereogum that it could not be rare to hear "Old Love / New Love" in a music club, a feeling shared by Andy Battagli, who compared it to Daft Punk in a the Current review; George Schlesinger noted for The Village Voice the song "[reminds] of the good stuff, the midnight mystique and inherent sexiness that help pull you back in"; and Andrew Unterberger mentioned for Spin that although it is the most aged song from Eclipse, it is "the most exciting for Shadow's future", as well. However, Samuel Tolzmann from Pretty Much Amazing called it "cheesy", and Joseph Moore asserted for No Ripcord that its millennial whoop is monotonous.

Several music critics graded "Old Love / New Love" as a highlight from Eclipse. But some of them criticized the album for this reason. In a review for The Observer, Daniel O'Boyle was disappointed of the result it "could have been"; J. Moore considered the "harmonies with Lacy [hinting] at a darkness far greater than what is expressed on" the album; Tom Walters named it for DIY "an infectious dance floor belter" but felt discomforted it became the focal point on a "brand new material [record]"; and David Turner from Rolling Stone added that "Old Love / New Love" gives "rave-level bliss on an album that more often sticks to cocksure swagger or somber introspection".

Track listing
The Music of Grand Theft Auto V, Vol. 1: Original Music (2013)
3. "Old Love / New Love" – 3:55

Armand Van Helden Remix (2015)
1. "Old Love / New Love [Armand Van Helden Remix]"  – 6:15

Eclipse (2015)
8. "Old Love / New Love"  – 3:49

Credits
Liner notes adapted from Eclipse, published by Warner Bros. Records.

George "Twin Shadow" Lewis Jr. – vocalist, producer, songwriter, bass, drums, guitar, keyboards
D'Angelo Lacy – featured vocalist, songwriter
Dennis Herring – co-producer, songwriter
Wynne Bennett – keyboards
Ryan Gilligan – audio engineer, additional mixing
Ted Jensen – masterer
Joe LaPorta – masterer

References

External links
, at Twin Shadow's Official Channel
, at Twin Shadow's Official Channel

2013 singles
2013 songs
American dance-pop songs
Grand Theft Auto V
American house music songs
Songs about telephone calls
Grand Theft Auto music